Barren County High School is a four-year public high school located in Glasgow, Kentucky, U.S. It is one of two high schools serving the Barren County school system, the other being the Trojan Academy.

It is located on the south side of Glasgow on Trojan Trail off of U.S. Route 31E near the exit 11 interchange off the Louie B. Nunn Cumberland Parkway.

The school's principal is Amy Irwin.

Athletics 
The Barren County High School athletic teams are known as the Trojans. The school colors are burgundy and  gold, a similar color scheme to that of the University of Southern California, whose collegiate teams are also called the Trojans.

References

External links
 
 Barren County Schools
 BCHS Live! on YouTube

Schools in Barren County, Kentucky
Public high schools in Kentucky
Glasgow, Kentucky
Barren County, Kentucky